Anahí Alejandra de Cárdenas Belmont (born June 14, 1983) is a Peruvian actress, model, dancer and singer.

Filmography

Theater

Discography
 2013: Who's That Girl?

Singles
 2013: "Gemini"

Guest artist

References

 "El Enfermo Imaginario" se estrena este fin de semana
 El gran show: Gino Pesaressi y Anahí de Cárdenas vuelven para la final
 Anahí de Cárdenas estrena nuevo look para esta Navidad | IMAGEN

External links

Living people
1983 births
21st-century Peruvian actresses
21st-century Peruvian women singers
21st-century Peruvian singers
Peruvian female models
Peruvian female dancers
Singers from Lima
Actresses from Lima
Peruvian film actresses
Peruvian stage actresses
Peruvian television actresses